The Kerch Polytechnic College massacre was a school shooting and bomb attack that occurred in Kerch, Crimea, on 17 October 2018, when 18-year-old student Vladislav Roslyakov killed 20 people and wounded 70 others before committing suicide. It was the deadliest school attack in the former Soviet Union since the 2004 Beslan school siege.

Attack

Vladislav Roslyakov purchased a shotgun on 8September 2018 and bought 150rounds legally at a gun shop on 13October 2018.  He entered the grounds of Kerch Polytechnic College on 17October 2018 at about 11:45 a.m. and shortly after began shooting. A survivor of the incident said that the shooting lasted for more than 15minutes.

Several witnesses described a lone gunman walking up and down the halls at Kerch Polytechnic College and firing randomly at classmates and teachers. He also fired at computer monitors, locked doors and fire extinguishers. A large nail-bomb was detonated during the attack, and local police said that they deactivated more explosives on the campus.  However, there was initially variation in survivors' accounts of the incident, with some claiming that a large bomb exploded and others describing only gunfire and the use of grenades.

The town website claimed that the explosion occurred on the first floor although the shooting occurred on the second. CNN reported that state television channel Russia-24 said that 200military personnel had been sent to the location. Eyewitness accounts differ about the time it took for law enforcement to respond, as times differ between 10 and 15minutes even though a police station is across the street, within  of the college. The massacre ended when the gunman committed suicide in the college's library.Graphic video footage of the attack was captured by school surveillance cameras and later posted on both the news programme Vesti.Krym's YouTube channel and on its website. This footage was later removed from both sites shortly afterwards.

Victims
Russia's National Anti-Terrorism Committee said that most of the victims were teenagers. Fifteen students and five teachers died.

The Kerch Deputy Mayor, Dilyaver Melgaziyev, initially clarified rumors on 18 October that six of the deceased were under the age of 18. This figure was later revised to eleven. Crimean authorities have published a list of the initial 20 victims who were killed.

The Russian Health Minister Veronika Skvortsova told reporters that a total of 70 people were wounded, 10 of whom were described as being in a "critical" condition, including five in comas.

Crimean State Council speaker Vladimir Konstantinov announced that the victims' families would receive financial compensation, with preliminary discussions suggesting that the payments would be 1 million rubles (USD ) from the Russian federal budget and 1 million rubles from the local budget.

Perpetrator 

The attack was perpetrated by a fourth-year student of the college, 18-year-old (2 May 2000 – 17 October 2018) Vladislav Igorevich Roslyakov.

When Roslyakov was around ten years old, his parents broke up when his father sustained a severe head injury, after which he became disabled and aggressive towards Roslyakov, his mother and other relatives. Roslyakov studied at a local school with no interest and poor grades. He had few friends and his hobbies included weapons and video games. In 2015 he joined the college to study to become an electrician. In college he developed an interest in explosives and weapons and started to take a knife bayonet to class. One day he discharged pepper spray in a class and failed to explain his actions. His mother, a Jehovah's Witness, limited his social activity, searched his pockets and refused to allow him to go to the cinema or use a computer, only allowing the latter when he turned 16.

In the days immediately before the attack, Roslyakov stated that he did not believe in the afterlife. On the eve of the attack, according to neighbours, Roslyakov burned a Bible in which he had highlighted verses, along with his mobile phone, and other books.

A friend has claimed that Roslyakov "hated the polytechnic very much" and had vowed revenge on his teachers. There were also reports that he may have been bullied. According to an ex-girlfriend, Roslyakov had informed her he had lost faith in people when his classmates started to ridicule him for being different. In the days before the attack he discussed ignorance by others, the lack of purpose in his life, mass shootings and suicide on social media. Roslyakov was in a number of online communities dedicated to serial killers.

Surveillance footage of the incident shows Roslyakov wearing black trousers and a white T-shirt emblazoned with the Russian word "НЕНАВИСТЬ" ("HATRED") as he carries an eight-shot 12 gauge Hatsan Escort Aimguard pump-action shotgun with a pistol grip. His clothing resembled that of Eric Harris, one of the perpetrators of the 1999 Columbine High School massacre, leading to speculation that the massacre was a copycat crime. According to some Russian tabloids, he had been a member of various Eric Harris and Dylan Klebold fanclubs on social networks, and had informed friends of his belief that "it would be good to have a massacre", specifically referencing Columbine High School massacre as an example. Furthermore, he had mentioned his belief in the two perpetrators being "awesome." Like perpetrator Eric Harris, Roslyakov committed suicide in the library of the college, by shooting himself with his shotgun.

Investigation 
Russia's Investigative Committee initially classified the attack as terrorism but later changed it to mass murder.
After the first reports of an alleged terrorist attack in Kerch, many Russian politicians and mass media suggested that the events were the activities of "Ukrainian saboteurs" and that the Ukrainian government was responsible, but changed their views after more information emerged, while others questioned whether Roslyakov was sufficiently checked before being allowed to purchase a gun and ammunition, which Roslyakov legally did.

In the days immediately following the massacre, investigators researched Roslyakov's background in attempts to establish his precise motive. These investigators also revealed that, ultimately, they were treating the incident as a calculated school shooting. Officials are investigating concerns in the case, such as where Roslyakov got the 30,000–40,000 rubles (–) for the weapon, and where he learned to use those weapons. It was discovered Roslyakov obtained a weapon permit in 2018 and owned the gun legally, after completing a legally required training on weapon security and presenting all required documents, including medical report. He periodically attended a shooting club. Shortly before the shooting he legally purchased 150 rounds of ammunition.

The Investigative Committee ordered a psychiatric evaluation of Roslyakov postmortem. Crimean Prime Minister Sergey Aksyonov stated on 18 October that it was possible the perpetrator had an accomplice, and police were searching for the individual "who was coaching" Roslyakov for the crime. However, on 9 November 2018, the Investigative Committee came to the conclusion that Roslyakov had acted alone.

Reactions
Crimean Prime Minister Sergey Aksyonov announced that there would be three days of mourning. Crimean State Council speaker Vladimir Konstantinov said that it was impossible to conceive that 18-year-old suspect Vladislav Roslyakov had prepared the attack by himself saying "On the ground, he acted alone, that is already known and established, but in my opinion and in the opinion of my colleagues this reprobate could not have carried out the preparations."

Sergei Mikhailovich Smirnov, deputy head of Russia's Federal Security Service (FSB), said the security services needed to have greater control over the Internet. Russian President Vladimir Putin said at the Valdai Discussion Club in Sochi that the attack appeared to be the result of globalisation, social media and the internet, and that "everything started with the tragic events in schools in the US...we're not creating healthy (Internet) content for young people...which leads to tragedies of this kind." Some saw the remarks to be a part of Russians blaming the West for the attack and a linkage with his past as head of the Kremlin and FSB before becoming president which The Irish Times said are "suspicious of the internet and social media, seeing them as western-dominated technologies that can be used to stir up dissent and street protests."

Russian political analyst Sergey Mikheyev on Russian state TV blamed the attack on "Western subculture," claiming that it "builds its matrix on the cult of violence...the one who has a weapon in his hands is right. This is a purely American approach to the matter." Some media saw the remarks to be a part of Russians blaming the West for the attack.

Leaders of several countries expressed their condolences to the victims of the attack, including Armenia, Estonia, Finland, Germany, Italy, Thailand, the UK, and Venezuela. Ukrainian President Petro Poroshenko expressed condolences to the victims, whom he described as Ukrainian citizens, stating that the Prosecutor General's Office of the Autonomous Republic of Crimea had initiated criminal proceedings under the article "act of terrorism". The Secretary General of the Council of Europe Thorbjørn Jagland and Secretary-General of the United Nations António Guterres also expressed condolences.

Some newspapers described the attack as "Russia's Columbine", a reference to the 1999 US high school massacre. Steven Rosenberg said the attack should not be surprising as he noted there had already been five attacks in schools in Russia in 2018 where a number of children were injured. A Telegraph article also claimed there had been half a dozen school attacks in Russia in 2018, although claiming the previous incidents involved knives and traumatic pistols rather than high-powered firearms.

Aftermath 
Students returned to studies 23 October, with checkpoints at the entrances at which the students' identities are confirmed. A spokesperson for the Rostov Region Directorate of the Russian Emergency Ministry, told reporters: "An examination has been carried out. According to the preliminary information, there is no danger of [the building's] collapse."

Copycat incidents 
On 28 May 2019, a student in Volsk, Saratov Region, Russia committed an attack with an axe and Molotov Cocktails (which he did not use), which left a girl seriously wounded. The attacker, 15-year-old Daniil Pulkin, was obsessed with Roslyakov. In August 2020, the minor was sentenced to seven years in prison in a juvenile hall.

Memorials 

Throughout Russia and other countries, hundreds of people gathered for memorials for the victims. In Moscow the memorial of Kerch in the Alexander Garden was decorated with flowers. A makeshift memorial was created outside of the school, for residents and survivors to bring flowers and toys.

An open memorial and funeral for the victims was held in the central square of Kerch, with a speech by Sergey Aksyonov, who told the crowd; "We don't want to talk, we want to weep. The history of Crimea will be divided in two — before and after 17 October. We need to be strong we need to be brave." Around 20,000 people were estimated to have attended the public funeral in Kerch.

See also 
 Kazan school shooting
 Perm State University shooting
 Columbine High School massacre
 Virginia Tech shooting
 List of massacres in Russia
 List of massacres in Ukraine
 List of school shootings
 List of mass shootings in Russia

Notes

References 

2018 mass shootings in Europe
Massacres in 2018
21st-century mass murder in Russia
2018 crimes in Russia
2018 crimes in Ukraine
2018 murders in Europe
Filmed killings
History of Crimea
Building bombings in Russia
Kerch
Mass murder in 2018
Mass shootings in Russia
Mass shootings in Ukraine
Massacres in Russia
Massacres in Ukraine
Murder–suicides in Europe
October 2018 crimes in Europe
October 2018 events in Russia
School bombings
School killings in Russia
School massacres
University and college shootings
Building bombings in Europe
School shootings in Russia
Columbine High School massacre copycat crimes